Mönsheim is a municipality in the Enz district of Baden-Württemberg, Germany.

History
Mönsheim became a possession of the Duchy of Württemberg in the 16th century.

About  of the lower Grenzbach in Mönsheim was placed under Federal protection as a Naturschutzgebiet in 1967.

Geography
The Heckengäu's table-like, karstified and forested muschelkalk hills describe much of Mönsheim's geography. The Grenzbach, a tributary of the Enz, is the main watercourse and marks its lowest elevation above sea level,  Normalnull (NN) at the border with Wiernsheim. The highest elevation,  NN, is found at the top of the Geißelberg.

Coat of arms
Mönsheim's municipal coat of arms shows a white, crenelated tower with a pointed roof on a green three-crested hill upon a field of red. The fortified tower, a motif that has represented Mönsheim since the 19th century, is a reference to a nearby keep given to the town in the 15th century by Duke Eberhard I.

References

Enzkreis
Württemberg